F. Rubinet (fl 1482–1507), sometimes given as Robinet, was a French composer and singer active in Florence, Italy. Six compositions credited to F. Rubinet were copied in Florence in the 1490s and are extent in the collection at the National Central Library in Florence. Scholars speculate that this composer is the same person as a cantor, "Robinetto francioso cantore", employed at the Santissima Annunziata, Florence in 1482–1483, and a 'contro alto' "fratrem Rubinectum franciosum" employed at the Florence Cathedral in 1506–1507. His compositions appear to have been influence by Loyset Compère, and use a similar 'cycle of fifths' utilized in Compère's compositions.

It is speculated by some, that F. Rubinet may be the composer of the ballad Entre Peronne et Saint Quentin ascribed to a Rubinus found in seven sources (two from central France) dating back to as early as 1460. However, other musicians have also been proposed as the author of this work.

References

Further reading
A. Pirro: ‘Robinet de la Magdalaine’, Mélanges de musicologie offerts à M. Lionel de La Laurencie (Paris, 1933), 15–18
H.M. Brown, ed.: A Florentine Chansonnier from the Time of Lorenzo the Magnificent, MRM, 7 (1983)
F. D’Accone: The Civic Muse: Music and Musicians in Siena (Chicago, 1997)
D. Fallows: A Catalogue of Polyphonic Songs, 1415–1480 (Oxford, 1999)

15th-century French composers